The Gymnasium Gars is a Gymnasium (high school) in Gars am Inn, Bavaria. Situated on the river Inn in the Gars valley, it was founded as a school of Latin by Augustinians before 1582 AD. It became a state school in 1972. It grew quickly and had about 1000 students and 70 teachers in 2006.
Today, a part of the school is still found inside the local Redemptorist monastery, but there were extensions in the 1980s and 1990s.

Schools in Bavaria
Mühldorf (district)
1582 establishments in the Holy Roman Empire
Educational institutions established in the 1580s